Woodland is an unincorporated community in Sussex County, Delaware, United States. Cannon's Ferry, which is listed on the National Register of Historic Places, is located in Woodland and is also known as the Woodland Ferry.

References

Unincorporated communities in Sussex County, Delaware
Unincorporated communities in Delaware